Sahibzada Sanaullah is a Pakistani politician who had been a member of the Provincial Assembly of Khyber Pakhtunkhwa, from August 2018 till January 2023. He had also been a member of the Provincial Assembly of Khyber Pakhtunkhwa from 2015 to May 2018.

Education
He has a Bachelor of Arts degree.

Political career

He ran for the seat of the Provincial Assembly of Khyber Pakhtunkhwa as a candidate of Pakistan Peoples Party (PPP) from Constituency PK-93 (Upper Dir-III) in 2013 Pakistani general election but was unsuccessful. He received 9,799 votes and lost the seat to Malik Behram Khan, a candidate of Jamaat-e-Islami Pakistan (JI).

He was elected to the Provincial Assembly of Khyber Pakhtunkhwa as a candidate of PPP from Constituency PK-93 (Upper Dir-III) in by-polls held in September 2015. He received 21,788 votes and defeated Azam Khan, a candidate of JI.

He was re-elected to Provincial Assembly of Khyber Pakhtunkhwa as a candidate of PPP from Constituency PK-11 (Upper Dir-II) in 2018 Pakistani general election.

References

Living people
Khyber Pakhtunkhwa MPAs 2013–2018
Pakistan People's Party politicians
Khyber Pakhtunkhwa MPAs 2018–2023
Year of birth missing (living people)